Javier Hernán Malagueño (born 27 October 1982 in Cosquín, Córdoba) is an Argentinian professional footballer who currently plays for Estudiantes de Altamira of the Ascenso MX in Mexico.

External links
 Málaga official profile
 
 Argentine Primera statistics 

1982 births
Living people
Sportspeople from Córdoba Province, Argentina
Argentine footballers
Association football defenders
Argentine Primera División players
Olimpo footballers
Racing Club de Avellaneda footballers
Huracán de Tres Arroyos footballers
Talleres de Córdoba footballers
Super League Greece players
Iraklis Thessaloniki F.C. players
Liga MX players
Indios de Ciudad Juárez footballers
Málaga CF players
Club Atlético Tigre footballers
Atlético Tucumán footballers
Argentine expatriate footballers
Expatriate footballers in Greece
Expatriate footballers in Mexico
Expatriate footballers in Spain